Antipater of Bostra was a Greek prelate who served as bishop of Bostra and was one of the foremost critics of Origen. He lived in the 5th century AD.

He was a pronounced opponent of Origen. Little is known of his life, save that he was held in high esteem by his contemporaries, civil and ecclesiastical. He is rated among the authoritative ecclesiastical writers by the Fathers of the Seventh General Council (787). There have reached us, in the acts of this council, only a few fragments of his lengthy refutation of the "Apology for Origen" put together (c. 309) by Pamphilus and Eusebius of Caesarea. The work of Antipater was looked on as a masterly composition, and, as late as 540 was ordered to be read in the churches of the East as an antidote to the spread of the Origenistic heresies (Cotelier, Monument. Eccl. Graec., III, 362). He also wrote a treatise against the Apollinarists, known only in brief fragments, and several homilies, two of which have reached us in their entirety. His memory is kept on 13 June.

Sources

5th-century Christian clergy
Bosra
People from Daraa Governorate